Fahey Flynn (August 6, 1916 – August 8, 1983) was a radio and television newscaster who spent the majority of his career in Chicago. Robert Feder of the Chicago Sun-Times described him as "an avuncular Irishman with a jaunty bow tie [and] a twinkle in his eye".

A six-time Emmy winner,  Flynn started his career in Fond du Lac, Wisconsin in 1934. Flynn worked in Chicago from 1941 until his death at a hospital there from internal hemorrhaging in 1983 at age 67. From 1953 to 1968, he was an anchor for WBBM-TV. He then joined Joel Daly as co-anchor at WLS-TV, and by 1971 the pair had become Chicago's highest-rated broadcasting team, retaining the lead in Chicago news ratings through 1979.

Flynn, a history and English major, graduated from the University of Wisconsin–Oshkosh in 1939 and received the distinguished alumni award in 1978.

Notes

External links

1916 births
1983 deaths
People from Escanaba, Michigan
American people of Irish descent
Television anchors from Chicago
American radio personalities
Emmy Award winners